Season twenty-one of the American television competition series Dancing with the Stars premiered on September 14, 2015.

On November 24, conservationist Bindi Irwin and Derek Hough were crowned the champions, while Backstreet Boys singer Nick Carter and Sharna Burgess finished in second place, and soldier (and hero of the 2015 Thalys train attack) Alek Skarlatos and Lindsay Arnold finished in third.

Cast

Couples
On August 19, 2015, nine professional dancers were revealed during Good Morning America. Returning pros included Karina Smirnoff, Anna Trebunskaya, and Louis van Amstel. Additionally, Lindsay Arnold also returned after spending four seasons as part of the troupe. While Peta Murgatroyd was originally announced as a professional, she was sidelined for the season by an ankle injury; Allison Holker replaced her spot in the cast. Bindi Irwin was the first celebrity revealed on August 24 on Good Morning America; other celebrities were revealed at different dates through different media. The full cast of celebrities and professional dancers was revealed on September 2, 2015.

Two celebrities (Kim Zolciak-Biermann and Tamar Braxton) withdrew during the competition due to health issues, marking the first time that two contestants withdrew from the competition mid-season.

Hosts and judges
Tom Bergeron and Erin Andrews returned as hosts, while judges Carrie Ann Inaba, Julianne Hough, and Bruno Tonioli all returned this season. After twenty seasons, Len Goodman did not return this season as a judge; in a video message during the finale, Goodman announced that he would return for season 22.  Season 19 champion Alfonso Ribeiro filled in for Tom Bergeron on October 5, 2015, while Bergeron attended to his ailing father, who subsequently died days later. Leah Remini also filled in as co-host on October 19 and October 26 while Erin Andrews covered the 2015 World Series. There were three guest judges during the course of the season. The first, season 19 champion Alfonso Ribeiro, was a judge for Week 3. Former pro dancer and season 18 champion, Maksim Chmerkovskiy, joined the judging panel for Week 5. The following week, Olivia Newton-John appeared as a guest judge as well.

Dance troupe 
Season 21 dance troupe consisted of returning members Jenna Johnson, Brittany Cherry, Sasha Farber and Alan Bersten, with new troupe member Hayley Erbert.

Scoring charts

Notes

 : The couples were scored on a 40-point scale due to the presence of a guest judge.
 : This was the lowest score of the week.
 : This was the highest score of the week.
 :  This couple finished in first place.
 :  This couple finished in second place.
 :  This couple finished in third place.
 :  this couple withdrew from the competition
 :  This couple was eliminated.

Highest and lowest scoring performances
The best and worst performances in each dance according to the judges' 30-point scale are as follows. Scores by guest judges are excluded.

Couples' highest and lowest scoring dances
Scores are based upon a potential 30-point maximum. Scores by guest judges are excluded.

Weekly scores
Individual judges' scores in the charts below (given in parentheses) are listed in this order from left to right: Carrie Ann Inaba, Julianne Hough, Bruno Tonioli.

Week 1: Premiere Night
The couples danced the cha-cha-cha, foxtrot, jive, quickstep or salsa. Couples are listed in the order they performed.

Week 2: Hometown Glory Week
The couples had to prepare two new dances to be performed on two consecutive nights. On Monday, the couples performed routines that celebrated the hometowns of the celebrities, with one couple being eliminated at the end of the show. On Tuesday, the remaining couples performed routines that celebrated the hometowns of the pro partners, with another couple being eliminated. The Charleston, contemporary, jazz, paso doble, rumba, tango, and waltz were introduced. Couples are listed in the order they performed.

Night 1

Night 2

Week 3: TV Night
Individual judges scores in the chart below (given in parentheses) are listed in this order from left to right: Carrie Ann Inaba, Alfonso Ribeiro, Julianne Hough, Bruno Tonioli.

The couples performed one unlearned dance to famous TV theme songs. The samba and Viennese waltz were introduced. Couples are listed in the order they performed.

After suffering a mini-stroke, Kim Zolciak-Biermann was unable to attend the dress rehearsal and live show, and had to withdraw from the competition. Her partner, Tony Dovolani, performed their routine (a samba) during the live show with stand-in Jenna Johnson. There was no additional elimination.

Week 4: Most Memorable Year Night
The couples performed one unlearned dance to celebrate the most memorable year of their lives. Couples are listed in the order they performed.

For the first time in the history of the program, Tom Bergeron did not appear as a host; he was absent to be with his ailing father. Alfonso Ribeiro filled in as co-host.

Week 5: Switch-Up Night
Individual judges scores in the chart below (given in parentheses) are listed in this order from left to right: Carrie Ann Inaba, Julianne Hough, Maksim Chmerkovskiy, Bruno Tonioli.

The couples performed one unlearned dance with a different partner selected by the general public. The Argentine tango was introduced. Couples are listed in the order they performed. Due to the nature of the week, no elimination took place at the end of the night.

Week 6: Famous Dances Night
Individual judges scores in the chart below (given in parentheses) are listed in this order from left to right: Carrie Ann Inaba, Julianne Hough, Olivia Newton-John, Bruno Tonioli.

The couples performed one unlearned dance that paid tribute to iconic dance performances from films and music videos. Leah Remini filled in for Erin Andrews.

Week 7: Halloween Night
Couples performed one unlearned dance and a team dance to Halloween-themed songs. Couples are listed in the order they performed.

Leah Remini once again filled in for Erin Andrews.

Week 8: Icons Night
Couples performed one unlearned dance that paid tribute to a personal icon of the celebrity; the couple with the highest score earned immunity from elimination, while the rest of the couples participated in dance-offs for extra points. For each dance-off, the couple with the highest score picked the opponent against whom they wanted to dance; the chosen opponent was allowed to pick the dance style (cha-cha-cha, jive, or samba). The winner of each dance-off earned three bonus points. Nick and Sharna received a three-point bonus for winning immunity. Couples are listed in the order they performed.

Week 9: Showstoppers Night
Couples performed one unlearned dance and a musical theater-inspired team-up dance with another couple, which involved the celebrities dancing side-by-side to the same song and receiving the same set of scores from the judges for the routine. Couples are listed in the order they performed.

During dress rehearsals, Tamar Braxton fell ill and was taken to the emergency room. She was unable to return for her contemporary dance; the judges' scores were based on dress rehearsal footage. Braxton did return in time for her team-up dance with Nick & Sharna. However, she subsequently withdrew from the competition after her doctors discovered pulmonary embolisms in her lungs.

Week 10: Semifinals
Couples performed one unlearned dance and a trio dance involving an eliminated pro or a pro from previous seasons. Midway through the show, the four couples participated in dance-offs, with the winners receiving three points to be added to their total scores. Couples are listed in the order they performed.

Due to the unexpected withdrawal of Tamar Braxton earlier in the week, all four couples advanced directly to the finals.

Week 11: Finals
On the first night, couples danced a previously-learned style to a new song that was coached by one of the three judges, as well as a freestyle routine. On the second night, the final three couples performed a fusion dance that combined two dance styles. Couples are listed in the order they performed.

Night 1

Night 2

Dance chart
The celebrities and professional partners danced one of these routines for each corresponding week:
 Week 1 (Premiere Night): One unlearned dance
 Week 2 (Hometown Glory Week): Two unlearned dances
 Week 3 (TV Night): One unlearned dance
 Week 4 (Most Memorable Year Night): One unlearned dance
 Week 5 (Switch-Up Night): One unlearned dance
 Week 6 (Famous Dances Night): One unlearned dance 
 Week 7 (Halloween Night): One unlearned dance & team dances
 Week 8 (Icons Night): One unlearned dance & dance-offs
 Week 9 (Showstoppers Night): One unlearned dance & team-up dances
 Week 10 (Semifinals): One unlearned dance, dance-offs & trio dance
 Week 11 (Finals, Night 1): Judge's choice & freestyle
 Week 11 (Finals, Night 2): Fusion dance

Notes

 :  This was the highest scoring dance of the week.
 :  This was the lowest scoring dance of the week.
 :  This couple gained bonus points for winning this dance-off.
 :  This couple gained no bonus points for losing this dance-off.
 :  This couple earned immunity and did not have to compete in the dance-off.
 :  This couple danced, but received no scores.

Ratings

Notes

References

External links

Dancing with the Stars (American TV series)
2015 American television seasons